Alejandría (Spanish for the name Alexandria) is a town and municipality in the Antioquia Department, Colombia. Part of the subregion of Eastern Antioquia. Bordered to the north with the municipalities of Concepción, Santo Domingo and San Roque, on the east by the municipality of San Rafael, on the south by the municipalities of San Rafael and Guatapé, and on the west by the municipalities of El Penol and Concepción. Its capital is 90 kilometers from the city of Medellin, the capital of Antioquia department. The municipality has an area of 149 km2.

History
As is the case with much of eastern Antioquia, what is today Alejandria was originally inhabited by the Tahamí people.

Alejandria was founded by Don Alejandro Osorio, Mrs. Procesa Delgado, Don Salvador Cordoba and Mr. Climaco Jaramillo in 1886.  By 1889 were erected the village to the township of the municipality category of Guatapé by agreement of February 20 that year.

Unlike what happened with almost all the municipalities of Antioquia, which were created by orders from departmental entities, the creation of Alejandria as a municipality was initiated by presidential decree from Bogota.  President Reyes agreed to the requests, and by decree 304 of March 1907, created the town of Alejandria.

Generalities
 Foundation: 1886
 Erection in Municipality: Decree 304 of 1907
 Founders:Alejandro Osorio, Procesa Delgado, Salvador Cordova and Climaco Jaramillo
 Appeals: The Pearl of Nare.
 Height above sea level: 1650.
 Temperature: 20 °C.
 Demonym: Alejandrinos, (Alexandrine)

Rural Zones, Veredas (Spanish)
Alejandria is divided into 15 Veredas:
 Cruces
 El Carbón
 El Cerro
 El Popo
 El Respaldo
 La Inmaculada
 La Pava
 Piedras
 Remolino
 San José
 San Lorenzo
 San Miguel
 San Pedro
 Tocaima
 San Antonio

Neighborhoods of Alejandría (Urban Zone)
 Centenario
 Mirador del Nare
 Nudillales
 Quintas
 La Bomba
 Concepcion
 Cordoba
 San Pedro
 Bolivar
 Santader
 La cruz
 Villanueva
 Miraflores

Climate
Alejandria has a cool tropical rainforest climate (Af) due to altitude. It has very heavy rainfall year-round.

Demographics 
Population Total: 4.657 inhabitants. (2018)
 Urban population: 2.561
 Rural population: 2.096
Literacy: 99.4% (2005)
 Urban Zone: 99.6%
 Rural Zone: 99.0%

Ethnography
According to figures submitted by the DANE of the census 2005, composition ethnographic the municipality is:
 Métis & White (99.7%)
 Afro (0.3%)

Roads

It has multiple access roads from Medellin city to the municipality of Alejandria:
 Route Medellin - Guarne - San Vicente - Concepcion - Alejandria Completely paved road
 Route Medellin - Barbosa - Concepcion - Alejandria, with uncovered stretch of road about 12 km from Barbosa.
 Route Medellin - Barbosa - Molino Viejo - Santo Domingo - Alejandria uncovered section of track with about 16 km from Santo Domingo.
 Route Medellin - Guarne - Marinilla - Penol - Guatape - Alejandria, with uncovered stretch of road about 25 km from Guatape.
 Route Medellin - Guarne - Marinilla - Penol - Guatape Alejandria-San Rafael: uncovered section of track with about 25 km from San Rafael.

Economy
 Tourism fishing, hiking, horseback riding, river rides
 Agriculture coffee, cane, fique, beans
 Livestock of up and Milk
 Mining: gold, silver
 Production of hydroelectric.

Events
 Celebrations of sympathy. First week of January. They are the traditional celebrations of the municipality, and exposes them the joy of the Alexandrians.
 Easter. We live the religious festival of Catholicism, and the municipality are carried out plays, and religious processions.
 Departmental abut Bands. Each year in March, takes place in the municipality, a musical encounter with different bands of the department.
 May 1. Sports activities are held
 Corpus Christi. With religious shrines through the streets of the town is celebrating this religious festival.
 celebrations of the Virgen del Carmen, July 16. This religious festival is celebrated with parades and pageants.
 Feast of the Antioquenidad, on August 11. Artistic representations are made about the culture paisa.
 Theatre Festival, Month of August
 Patron Saint Peter of Alejandria, November 22. It parades and other religious activities.
 Holidays. Christmas novenas are performed, musical concerts, and other activities.

Sites of interest

Natural heritage
  Reservoirs of San Lorenzo and El Penol-Guatape
 River Nare, with many attractions such as natural pools, meadows, and fishing 
 Waterfall "Bridal Veil"  located 5 km of the head on the sidewalk swirl
 Waterfall "Sabina", located 3 miles from the trail head in the Whirlwind, imposing waterfall of 60 m high
 River Nudillales, with sites for the enjoyment of fishing and bathing
 Nudillales Spa, located in the Centenario neighborhood, has natural pools, and areas suitable for camping trips and pot.
 Height Combo
 Nature Reserve San Lorenzo
 River Piedras
 Lake the Perucho

Historical and artistic heritage
 Bridge Nudillales located 0.5 km in the header. The appeal of this site are the pools for swimming
 Bridge of Purgatory, located 12 kilometers from the head on the sidewalk Swirl. The attraction of this site is the bridge for its antiquity and former obligatory step of communication with the northeast  region and gold transport
 Church of St. Peter of Alejandria. In 1884 he created the first chapel
 Former home of Alejandro Osorio, founder of the municipality.
 Bridge of Cirpes
 Library Municipal Alejandro Osorio, where there is a photographic record of the history of the town.
 Museum school of music.
  principal Park of Alejandria.

References

Municipalities of Antioquia Department
Populated places established in 1886
1886 establishments in Colombia